Mattathur  is a village in Thrissur district in the Indian state of Kerala.

Demographics
 census, Mattathur had a population of 28,975 with 13,929 males and 15,046 females.

References

Villages in Thrissur district